Minuscule 292 (in the Gregory-Aland numbering), ε 378 (Soden), is a Greek minuscule manuscript of the New Testament, on parchment. Palaeographically it has been assigned to the 12th or 13th century. 
It has full marginalia.

Description 

The codex contains a complete text of the four Gospels on 290 parchment leaves, with lacunae (Matt 1:1-7:13; John 19:5-21:25). The text is written in one column per page, in 19-22 lines per page. It was written by several different hands.

There is also a division according to the Ammonian Sections (in Mark 241 Sections, the last in 16:20), with references to the Eusebian Canons (written below Ammonian Section numbers).

It contains lectionary markings at the margin for liturgical reading, Synaxarion (later hand), and pictures.

Text 

The Greek text of the codex is a representative of the Byzantine text-type. According to Hermann von Soden it is related to the Byzantine commentated text. Aland placed it in Category V.
According to the Claremont Profile Method it belongs to the textual family Kx in Luke 1. In Luke 10 and Luke 20 it represents the textual cluster Π473.

It is close to the codex 53.

History 

The manuscript was added to the list of New Testament manuscripts by Scholz (1794-1852). 
It was examined by Wettstein and Griesbach. It was examined and described by Paulin Martin. C. R. Gregory saw it in 1885.

The manuscript is currently housed at the Bibliothèque nationale de France (Gr. 114) at Paris.

See also 

 List of New Testament minuscules
 Biblical manuscript
 Textual criticism

References

Further reading 

 Jean-Pierre-Paul Martin, Description technique des manuscrits grecs relatifs au Nouveau Testament, conservés dans les bibliothèques de Paris (Paris 1883), p. 72.

Greek New Testament minuscules
13th-century biblical manuscripts
Bibliothèque nationale de France collections